Barbasol is an American brand of shaving cream, aftershave, and disposable razors created by MIT Professor Frank Shields in 1919 in Indianapolis. It is currently owned by Perio, Inc.

Invention
MIT Professor Frank Shields set out to create a product that would provide for a less irritating shave. In 1919, he succeeded with the invention of Barbasol – a shaving cream that did not have to be worked into a lather. The original formula was a thick lotion and is most closely related to the modern Barbasol Non-Aerosol Therapeutic Shave Cream.

Brand history

Napco Corporation
Barbasol was first manufactured under the Napco Corporation name, a company Frank Shields started before inventing Barbasol. After the shaving cream sales increased, they outgrew Napco, and The Barbasol Company was created.

The Barbasol Company
Frank Shields established The Barbasol Company in 1920, which owned the brand for 42 years. In the mid-1950s, design engineer Robert P. Kaplan of Rochester, NY invented and patented the first aerosol shaving cream can, and the Barbasol Company changed the formula from the thick cream in a tube to the soft, fluffy foam familiar in the aerosol cans today. The can design mimicked a barber's pole, and is still the trademark design used today.

Pfizer
In 1962, Pfizer bought The Barbasol Company and brought Barbasol into the portfolio. During this time, they developed many additional versions of Barbasol to complement the original formulation, including Soothing Aloe, Skin Conditioner, Sensitive Skin, Extra Protection, Cool Menthol and Lemon Lime.

As gels became popular, Pfizer created gel versions of Barbasol in the Original, Soothing Aloe, Sensitive Skin, and Extra Protection varieties.

In the 1980s, Pfizer made Barbasol Glide Stick, a deodorant.

By the 1990s, Barbasol brand equity had diminished. Sales had slowed. Pfizer, primarily a pharmaceutical company, looked to sell the brand.

Perio, Inc.

Perio, Inc., based in Dublin, Ohio, bought the Barbasol brand from Pfizer in 2001 and has sought to revitalize it. They consolidated the Barbasol line to Original, Soothing Aloe, and Skin Conditioner, and added Pacific Rush.

A non-aerosol cream that simulated the original product was created in 2003, but it was reformulated to the Barbasol Non-Aerosol Therapeutic Shave Cream in 2006 (Pfizer also had a similar simulation of the original Barbasol cream, but discontinued it in 1999).

Later, Barbasol released Sensitive Skin, Mountain Blast (a new fragrance), and Arctic Chill (menthol) to its line of shaving creams.  Several aftershave products have been introduced under the Barbasol brand name. Still later, Barbasol introduced disposable razors in twin-blade, three-blade, and six-blade versions.

Barbasol's market share continues to grow, with one in four men now using it.

Advertising

Early advertising
Barbasol became a very popular shaving cream after its introduction. Throughout the 1920s and 1930s, many print advertisements were used to support its growth. Many of the print ads featured men and women in situations that would be considered risqué for their time.

The company also used several famous spokesmen throughout the years, including actor Douglas Fairbanks Jr., star baseball players Babe Ruth and Rogers Hornsby, as well as football legend Knute Rockne.

In 1938, Barbasol sponsored a car in the Indianapolis 500, and painted it to look like a tube of the cream. Driven by George Bailey, the car made it to lap 166 of 200 before suffering clutch problems. The following year, the Barbasol car finished in tenth place. The team got involved as a sponsor in the NASCAR Busch Series in the late 1990s, sponsoring Dick Bown's team and drivers Chuck and Jim Bown, Jim Sauter, and Greg Biffle in eleven races in 1996, then going to Akins Motorsports and drivers Glenn Allen Jr. and Elton Sawyer starting in 1997.

The tagline throughout this time was "No brush, no lather, no rub in."

Singin' Sam, the Barbasol Man
One of the most nostalgic figures in Barbasol's history was Singin' Sam the Barbasol Man, whose real name was Harry Frankel.

Frankel got his start as a vaudevillian, and eventually became the spokesperson for a lawnmower company and began broadcasting out of Cincinnati. The Barbasol Company soon heard him and, in 1931, signed him on as Singin' Sam the Barbasol Man, where he made famous the Barbasol jingle, "Barbasol, Barbasol ... No brush, no lather, no rub-in ... Wet your razor, then begin."

Advertising since 2001
Barbasol's advertising since 2001 is not as suggestive as its 1920s counterparts. Many television ads from 2001 to 2009 have featured a close-call situation, followed by one person saying "Close shave!" and another person responding with "Better buy Barbasol!" The "close shave" double entendre has been replaced with the more patriotic tagline "Close Shave America, Close Shave Barbasol." (This can be heard, for example, on the Fred Thompson Show radio podcast).  The related advertising relies less on tongue-in-cheek humor and associates the brand more with a warm, homey feeling.

In February 2012, Barbasol signed a five-year agreement with Major League Soccer side Columbus Crew that would see the brand become the club's shirt sponsor.

Barbasol is a main sponsor of radio network Westwood One, with its radio commercials (most of which featured former NFL quarterback Boomer Esiason) being heard during sporting events broadcast on Westwood One.

The Barbasol Championship is a professional golf tournament scheduled that was played for the first time on the PGA Tour in 2015 as an alternative event for the 2015 Open Championship. The tournament is played on the Grand National course of the Robert Trent Jones Golf Trail in Opelika, Alabama.

Barbasol has created a social media presence, including a Twitter-based sweepstakes.

In the 1993 sci-fi feature film Jurassic Park, an embryo cryopreservation container is hidden in a modified Barbasol can. The brand was used to market the 2015 sequel Jurassic World. Special dinosaur-themed cans were released, along with a promotion offering a trip to an archaeological excavation in Wyoming.

In popular culture
Barbasol's longevity in the American marketplace has made it an unmistakable icon for shaving. It is often the representative for a can of shaving cream, simply for its recognizable packaging, and can be seen in such movies as Jurassic Park, Dead Men Don't Wear Plaid, and Evan Almighty.
 In the 1950s musical Guys and Dolls, the character Benny Southstreet sings, "When a lazy slob takes a goody steady job, And he smells from Vitalis and Barbasol..." as a metaphor for a man cleaning himself up to retain a woman's affections.
 A can of Barbasol shaving foam plays a central role in the 1993 science fiction film Jurassic Park. The Barbasol can, which is actually a disguised portable embryo container, is handed over to Dennis Nedry (played by Wayne Knight) by Ingen's rival company Biosyn head Dodgson to help him carry stolen dinosaur embryos to a ship waiting at the docks. Nedry checks the can, which has a bottom that can be screwed off, and real shaving cream if customs officials ask questions. While attempting to leave Jurassic Park with the stolen embryos, Nedry becomes lost in a rainstorm, crashes his Jeep and is attacked and killed by a Dilophosaurus. The can falls and becomes buried in mud.
 In the 1998 musical satire, Reefer Madness, the character Mr. Poppy sings, "Sometimes men would come to call who stank of sin and Barbasol, they'd ask kids if they felt at all like having themselves a few kicks!" in reference to the product's popularity during the 1930s, in which the show is set.
 The 2008 American Idol winner David Cook's second single was "Bar-ba-sol".
In the 2009 webcomic "Homestuck", made by Andrew Hussie , in panel 1473, The character "AR?" doffs his hat towards a female, the reference comes in when he mentions the line; "Probably not the best idea around all this oil. Especially without any sort of flame suppressant handy." The line "flame suppressant" can be clicked on and will take you to a google image search of Barbasol.

North American distribution
Barbasol is distributed throughout North America.

References

External links
Official website

Shaving cream brands
Male grooming brands